ISSF may refer to:

 Islamic Solidarity Sports Federation
 International Seafood Sustainability Foundation
 International Shooting Sport Federation
 International Student Science Fair